Paani is a 2019 Indian Marathi-language drama film directed by Adinath Kothare and produced by Priyanka Chopra and Madhu Chopra under the banner of Purple Pebble Pictures. The film stars Subodh Bhave and Kishore Kadam, with Addinath Kothare and Rucha Vaidya. The film was released in India in 2019. In 2019, the film won the National Film Awards for Best Film on Environment Conservation.

Plot 
Addinath aka Hemant Babu Kendre is an ordinary man living in a Nagderwadi, a village in Nanded, plagued with drought. Paani follows his journey towards making the village independent of water, all while dealing with local goons, a budding romance, and other disruptions of daily life.

Cast

Main 

 Subodh Bhave
 Kishore Kadam

Other 

 Addinath Kothare
 Rucha Vaidya

Screening 
The film was screened at New York Film Festival in the United States of America and was awarded the Best Film on Environment/Conservation/Preservation at the 66th National Film Awards in 2019.

Awards

Reception 
Siddhant Adlakha of Firstpost stated "On paper, Paani amounts to a linear tale of steely determination overcoming the odds. However, in Adinath Kothare’s hands, it’s a nuanced character piece."

References

External links 
 

2010s Marathi-language films
2019 films
Indian drama films